Otto Friedrich Ignatius (28 July 1794, Hageri - 7 September 1824, Saint Petersburg) was a Baltic-German painter, writer, and composer.

Life and work 
His father, was a parish priest and theologian, who founded a school where he received his first drawing lessons. One of his fellow students, Gustav Adolf Hippius, also became a prominent painter, and a lifelong friend. He married Ignatius' sister, Friederike (1798–1886), in 1820.

From 1812 to 1813, he studied at the Imperial Academy of Fine Arts in St. Petersburg. This was followed by studies at the Academy of Arts, Berlin, with Friedrich Georg Weitsch. In 1815, together with Hippius and August Georg Wilhelm Pezold, he went to Dresden, then Prague and Vienna. At the Academy of Fine Arts in Vienna, he was a student of Heinrich Friedrich Füger.

His travels then took him to Italy, in 1817, where he lived and worked in Rome for two years. He also became associated with the Nazarene movement. He returned to Hageri in 1819, but was there only briefly before moving to Reval (Tallinn).

The following year, he became a painter for the court of Tsar Alexander I, at the Hermitage. He held that position until 1824, when he died of tuberculosis, shortly after the death of his wife, Adelheid, to whom he had been married for only a little more than a year.

His best known works are portraits, although he also created numerous works on religious themes. What would have been his greatest work, a wall painting in the church at Tsarskoye Selo, was left unfinished when he died. It was later completed by his friend, Hippius, but was ultimately destroyed during World War II.

He was also an amateur writer, producing poems and dramas; including a tragedy on the life of Marino Faliero (1824). He wrote songs as well. His Italian diary was published posthumously, in 1830.

References

Further reading 
 Carola L. Gottzmann, Petra Hörner: Lexikon der deutschsprachigen Literatur des Baltikums und St. Petersburgs. Vol.2; Verlag Walter de Gruyter, 2007. pp.625f 
 Helmut Scheunchen: Lexikon deutschbaltischer Musik., Harro von Hirschheydt, 2002 pp.116-118

External links 

 Entry on Ignatius @ the Baltische Historische Kommission
 Biographical notes on Ignatius @ the Estnischen Kunstmuseums
 Pages from his Italian diary @ EEVA: Digital Text Repository for Older Estonian Literature, University of Tartu

1794 births
1824 deaths
Russian painters
Baltic German people from the Russian Empire
Russian portrait painters
Imperial Academy of Arts alumni
People from Kohila Parish